Andrea Rydin Berge (born 26 April 1984 in Oslo, Norway) is a Norwegian jazz musician (vocals, piano and autoharp), composer and band leader, known from her own Andrea Kvintett.

Career 
Berge has a background from music studies at the University of Oslo and Complete Vocal Institute while the other quintet members, Svein Magnus Furu (tenor saxophone and clarinet), Harald Lassen (tenor saxophone), Kim-Erik Pedersen (alto and baritone saxophones) and Christian Meaas Svendsen (upright bass), have experience from the Norwegian Academy of Music. All belong to the "young and very promising" generation that is starting to pave their way into the established, professional Norwegian jazz scene with big steps. The arrangements is by Berge and the band, and since she is also co-producer, there is not much doubt about who is the driving force in the band.

Discography 

Andrea Kvintett
2012: Andrea Kvintett (NorCD)
2013: Russian Dream (NorCD)

References

External links 

1984 births
Musicians from Oslo
Living people
Norwegian jazz composers
Norwegian women jazz singers
Norwegian jazz singers
21st-century Norwegian singers
21st-century Norwegian women singers